Juan Ramón Cáceres López (born 30 March 2002) is a Paraguayan footballer who plays as a midfielder for Paraguayan Primera División side Club Sol de América.

Career

Sol de América
Cáceres was born and raised in Bañado Sur in Tacumbú, which is one of the barrios of Asunción in Paraguay. At the age of six, he joined Sol de Quinta Avenida soccer school and when he turned 12, he began playing for Club Sol de América.

Cáceres got his official debut for the club on 17 July 2019 against Club El Porvenir in the Copa Paraguay, where he scored a goal. His debut in the Paraguayan Primera División came on 1 September 2019, when he came on as a substitute for Ignacio Colombini against Sportivo San Lorenzo.

In the 2020 season, Cáceres played a total of five league games and scored one goal.

References

External links
 

Living people
2002 births
Association football midfielders
Paraguayan footballers
Paraguayan Primera División players
Club Sol de América footballers
Sportspeople from Asunción